Paola Baldión is a Colombian actress, known for her starring role in Portraits in a sea of lies. She is the only daughter of Raúl Baldión and Claudia Fischer.

Early years
Baldión was born in Paris and lived there until she was three years old. Her passion for acting began at an early age, participating in her parents' puppet theater company in Florence, Italy. At the age of ten, Paola and her parents moved to Colombia, where she studied theater for three years with Edgardo Román and Paco Barrero. At that time, when she was seventeen, she secured her first audition for Amor a thousand, a Colombian soap opera that lasted almost two years. This opened the doors and began working on other television series such as This is the life and stories of men only for women.
 
She also appeared in commercials for Telecom and Antipiratería, and in short films such as Trip to the Messiah of Felipe Paz.
 
She moved to New York at twenty and studied acting at HB Studio for two years. While studying, she shot short films with a group of friends. In the summer of 2003, she worked in a Bollywood production called Kal Ho Naa Ho, in which she performed the role of a salsa dancer. At that time, she moved to Montreal where she graduated in Theater and Film Studies at the Concordia University.

Professional life
Baldión's professional career began on Colombian television with the television series "Love A thousand", directed by Harold Trompetero and starring Manolo Cardona and Patricia Vásquez.

Her first feature film as an actress was "Portraits in a sea of lies" (2010), the first film by director Carlos Gaviria, for which she won the best actress award at the Amiens (France), Guadalajara (Mexico) and Macondo Award.

In 2020, she worked on the movie "Lady Of Guadalupe", a project directed by Pedro Brenner, and "Love Doll", a film directed by Michael Flores. Both will be on the billboard in 2020.

On December 4, 2019, she will premiere his first documentary as director and producer; "I Am Migration."

Filmography

Film

Television

References

Living people
Colombian film actresses
Year of birth missing (living people)
French emigrants to Colombia